ABC Television in South Australia comprises national and local programming on the ABC television network in the Australian state of South Australia, headquartered in Adelaide.

ABS or ABS-2 was the historic call sign and name of the Australian Broadcasting Corporation's television station in Adelaide, with the "S" standing for South Australia.

History

ABS began broadcasting on 11 March 1960 from studios in the suburb of Collinswood. The station's transmitter is located at Mount Lofty, and is augmented by a series of relay transmitters located throughout the state.

ABS commenced digital television transmission in January 2001, broadcasting on VHF Channel 12 while maintaining analogue transmission on VHF Channel 2. The analogue signal for ABS was shut off at 9am on Tuesday, 2 April 2013, making Adelaide the first state capital to make the permanent switch, with Canberra being the first city to do so in 2012.

In an email to staff, Scott said:"[We will] close our Adelaide television production studio and wind down remaining television production in smaller states. The economics of the television sector make it difficult to maintain small-scale operations. It is more economically efficient to base production (outside news and current affairs) in Sydney and Melbourne. TV’s aim is to work with the independent sector on programming that better reflects local diversity. To demonstrate accountability, the ABC will deliver detailed annual reports on its local production, including dollars invested and programs made."

Programs produced in the Adelaide studios
The following programs were produced in the Adelaide studios of ABC Television:
Couch Potato
Talking Heads
Behind the News
Poh's Kitchen
News on 3

ABC Television in South Australia today
 there is a large number of transmitters broadcasting a number of ABC channels.

Local programming
Only the local edition of ABC News continues to be broadcast from Adelaide. ABC News South Australia is presented by Jessica Harmsen from Monday to Thursday. The weeknight bulletins also incorporate a national finance segment presented by Alan Kohler in Melbourne. Weekend bulletins feature local sport bulletins presented by Neil Cross.

Relay stations
The following stations relayed ABS throughout South Australia:

Notes:
1. HAAT estimated from http://www.itu.int/SRTM3/ using EHAAT.
2. ABCS was on VHF channel 7 from its 1973 sign-on until sometime in the 1980s.
3. Analogue transmissions ceased as of 15 December 2010 as part of the national shutdown of analogue television.

See also
 History of the Australian Broadcasting Corporation
 Television broadcasting in Australia

References

Television stations in Adelaide
Television channels and stations established in 1960
Australian Broadcasting Corporation television stations